Fernando González de la Cuesta (died 1561) was a Roman Catholic prelate who served as Bishop-Elect of La Plata o Charcas (1561).

Biography
On 25 Jun 1561, Fernando González de la Cuesta was appointed during the papacy of Pope Pius IV as Bishop of La Plata o Charcas.
He died before his consecration as Bishop-Elect of La Plata o Charcas until his death on 24 Sep 1561.

References

External links and additional sources
 (for Chronology of Bishops) 
 (for Chronology of Bishops) 

16th-century Roman Catholic bishops in Bolivia
Bishops appointed by Pope Pius IV
1561 deaths
Roman Catholic bishops of Sucre